Mudeungbyeong (literally "rank-less soldier") is a term describing the lowest possible military rank in the armed forces of South Korea. It is the combined equivalent of an army recruit or seaman recruit in other militaries of the world.

The official name is jangjeong (장정), which refers to enlistees before they have been assigned a rank. A jangjeong wears no insignia and the rank is typically only held by those attending initial basic training.  The term hullyeonbyeong (훈련병), meaning "trainee," is also sometimes used for those still in boot camp.

The North Korean Korean People's Army does not maintain an equivalent position.

See also
Military of South Korea
Government of South Korea

Military ranks of South Korea